Joshua Luis Fuentes (born February 19, 1993) is an American professional baseball first baseman in the Atlanta Braves organization. He has played in Major League Baseball (MLB) for the Colorado Rockies. He made his MLB debut in 2019.

Amateur career
Fuentes attended Trabuco Hills High School in Mission Viejo, California and played college baseball at Saddleback College and Missouri Baptist University. He was signed by the Colorado Rockies as an undrafted free agent in 2014.

Professional career
Fuentes made his professional debut in 2014 with the Tri-City Dust Devils and spent the whole season there, batting .260 with one home run and 16 RBIs in 41 games. He played 2015 with the Asheville Tourists, compiling a .252 batting average with six home runs and 42 RBIs in 93 games, and 2016 with Asheville and Modesto Nuts where he slashed a combined .307/.366/.505 with 13 home runs and 64 RBIs in 105 total games between both teams. He played 2017 with the Hartford Yard Goats where he batted .307 with 15 home runs, 72 RBIs, and a .869 OPS in 122 games and started 2018 with the Albuquerque Isotopes.

Colorado Rockies
The Rockies added Fuentes to their 40-man roster after the 2018 season. He was promoted to the major leagues on April 6, 2019, and made his major league debut that night. He recorded a pinch-hit single versus Yimi García in his first Major League at-bat. During the 2020 season Fuentes took over the first base job during the season and his offensive production was among the best on the team. In 30 games, he hit .306 with two home runs and 17 RBI.

After a slow start to 2021 Fuentes was named NL Player of the Week on May 17, batting .500 for the week and tying a Rockies record for most consecutive games with an RBI. During the middle of the season, Fuentes hit a rough patch in which he ended up losing his starting role on the team and ultimately was demoted to AAA. He ended the season hitting .225 with seven home runs and 33 RBI in 95 games. On October 21, Fuentes was outrighted off of the 40-man roster. He elected free agency on November 7, 2021.

Toronto Blue Jays
On March 26, 2022, Fuentes signed a minor league contract with the Toronto Blue Jays. He was released on May 23, 2022.

Leones de Yucatán
On June 14, 2022, Fuentes signed with the Leones de Yucatán of the Mexican League. In 41 games, he slashed .299/.364/.576 with 10 home runs and 27 RBI.

Atlanta Braves
On December 23, 2022, Fuentes signed a minor league deal with the Atlanta Braves.

Personal life
His cousin, Nolan Arenado, plays for the Cardinals.

References

External links

1993 births
Living people
People from Rancho Cucamonga, California
Baseball players from California
Major League Baseball infielders
Colorado Rockies players
Saddleback Gauchos baseball players
Missouri Baptist Spartans baseball players
Tri-City Dust Devils players
Asheville Tourists players
Modesto Nuts players
Hartford Yard Goats players
Tomateros de Culiacán players
American expatriate baseball players in Mexico
Albuquerque Isotopes players
Salt River Rafters players
Leones de Yucatán players
Mankato MoonDogs players
Buffalo Bisons (minor league) players